Kati Apo Mena (Greek: Κάτι Από ΄Μένα; English: Something From Me) is the sixth studio album by Greek singer Sakis Rouvas, released on 3 December 1998. The album is largely written by Giorgos Theofanous. This was Rouvas' first album with Minos EMI group and gained success, becoming gold two months after its release.

Album information

Producers and collaborators
This was Rouvas' first album produced entirely by Vangelis Yannopoulos.  It was also the first Rouvas' album released by Minos-Emi.  Music was almost entirely written by composer Giorgos Theofanous. Folk-rock singer Stelios Rokkos also contributed four tracks to the album while Vangelis Konstantinidis also penned several tracks, as well as Natalia Germanou and Nikos Gritsis.

Track listing

Release history

Singles
"Theleis I Den Theleis"
The only CD single from the album : it was released in late May 1998 along with three other songs that appeared on the album. 

"I Kardia Mou"
The leading single from the album, released in December.

"Den Ehi Sidera I Kardia Sou"
 The third single from the album was released in early 1999.

"Ipirhes Panda"
The final single from the album, released in Spring 1999.

Music videos
Four of the songs from the album were made into videos:
"Theleis I Den Theleis" (Director: Yorgos Lanthimos)
"I Kardia Mou" (Director: Yorgos Lanthimos)
"Den Ehi Sidera I Kardia Sou" (Director: Yorgos Lanthimos)
"Ipirhes Panda" (Director: Yorgos Lanthimos)

External links
Sakis Rouvas' official website
IFPI Greece official website with Greek charts

References 

1998 albums
Greek-language albums
Minos EMI albums
Sakis Rouvas albums